The Rangitikei District is a territorial authority district located primarily in the Manawatū-Whanganui region in the North Island of New Zealand, although a small part, the town of Ngamatea (13.63% by land area), lies in the Hawke's Bay Region. It is located in the southwest of the island, and follows the catchment area of the Rangitīkei River.

The Rangitikei District Council is the local government authority for this district. It is composed of a mayor, currently Andy Watson, and 11 councillors, one of whom is the deputy mayor.

History
The Rangitikei District was established in 1989 as part of the 1989 local government reforms.

Government and politics

Local government

The current Mayor of Rangitikei is Andy Watson, elected in 2013 and re-elected in 2016 and 2019. Watson was first elected in 2013 by obtaining 1,983 votes (41.5%) of the vote and a majority of 486 (10.2%) beating incumbent mayor Chalky Leary.

Rangitikei District Council is served by eleven councillors elected across five wards. Two councillors are elected from the Bulls ward, one from the Hunterville ward, four from the Marton ward, three from the Taihape ward and one from the Turakina board.

Regional government
Rangitikei District is one of ten districts located partially or entirely within the Manawatū-Whanganui region. As such it is represented on the Manawatū-Whanganui Regional Council, known as Horizons Regional Council. Two of the twelve regional councillors are elected by the district in the Manawatu - Rangitikei ward; the two regional councillors elected in the 2016 elections are Bruce Gordon and Gordon McKellar.

National government
Rangitikei is located in the general electorate of Rangitīkei and in the Māori electorate of Te Tai Hauāuru. Rangitīkei is a safe National Party seat since the 1938 election with the exception of 1978–1984 when it was held by Bruce Beetham of the Social Credit Party. Since 2011 it is held by Ian McKelvie.

Te Tai Hauāuru is a more volatile seat, having been held by three different parties since 1996, i.e. New Zealand First, the Māori Party and the Labour Party. Since 2014 it is held by Adrian Rurawhe of the Labour Party.

Geography

Located north of Wellington, the district stretches from the South Taranaki Bight toward the North Island Volcanic Plateau, forming a trapezium-shaped block that includes the towns of Taihape, Bulls, Marton, Hunterville, and Mangaweka. The district has a land area of 4,483.91 km².

Climate
Rangitikei's climate is temperate and has few extremes compared to many parts of New Zealand. According to the Köppen climate classification, this climate is classified as oceanic climate (Cfb). Summers are warm with average temperatures in the low 20s. The most settled weather occurs in summer and early autumn. Winters are mild near the coast and on the plains; it is colder inland and in the hill country, but often frosty, clear and calm. Snowfall occasionally settles in areas 400 m above sea level, such as Taihape. Annual rainfall is moderate and annual hours of bright sunshine can average over 2,000.

Demographics

Rangitikei District had a population of 15,027 at the 2018 New Zealand census, an increase of 1,008 people (7.2%) since the 2013 census, and an increase of 315 people (2.1%) since the 2006 census. There were 5,721 households. There were 7,554 males and 7,473 females, giving a sex ratio of 1.01 males per female. The median age was 41.4 years (compared with 37.4 years nationally), with 3,135 people (20.9%) aged under 15 years, 2,586 (17.2%) aged 15 to 29, 6,492 (43.2%) aged 30 to 64, and 2,814 (18.7%) aged 65 or older.

Ethnicities were 79.2% European/Pākehā, 26.2% Māori, 5.6% Pacific peoples, 2.1% Asian, and 1.7% other ethnicities. People may identify with more than one ethnicity.

The percentage of people born overseas was 12.1, compared with 27.1% nationally.

Although some people objected to giving their religion, 46.1% had no religion, 38.5% were Christian, 0.2% were Hindu, 0.2% were Muslim, 0.2% were Buddhist and 6.2% had other religions.

Of those at least 15 years old, 1,365 (11.5%) people had a bachelor or higher degree, and 2,964 (24.9%) people had no formal qualifications. The median income was $27,200, compared with $31,800 nationally. 1,242 people (10.4%) earned over $70,000 compared to 17.2% nationally. The employment status of those at least 15 was that 5,742 (48.3%) people were employed full-time, 1,884 (15.8%) were part-time, and 417 (3.5%) were unemployed.

Transport

Roads
State Highway 1  goes through Bulls. The North Island portion of this national state highway, one of only eight in New Zealand, begins at Cape Reinga / Te Rerenga Wairua and ends at Wellington International Airport—passing through Bulls at 925 km.

State Highway 3  passes through Bulls. This highway connects Woodville (25 km east of Palmerston North) and Hamilton via New Plymouth.

State Highway 54  connects Palmerston North and SH 1 at Vinegar Hill via Feilding.

Public transport
InterCity runs five daily and three non-daily bus services in Marton and Bulls. These include Whanganui–Wellington, Palmerston North–Auckland, Tauranga–Wellington, Wellington–New Plymouth and Auckland–Palmerston North.

Marton used to be serviced by the North Island Main Trunk (or Overlander), a railway line connecting Auckland and Wellington. However, in 2012 the Overlander was replaced by the Northern Explorer, which has fewer stops and does not stop in Marton.

The nearest airports to the district are Whanganui Airport, located 37 km west (of Marton), and Palmerston North Airport, located 44 km southeast. Both airports are domestic only.

Education

Secondary schools
Rangitikei College, Marton
Nga Tawa Diocesan School, Marton
Turakina Maori Girls' College, Marton (until 2015, now closed)
Taihape Area School, Taihape (years 1–13)

See also
Parewahawaha Marae

References

External links

 Rangitikei.com
 Recreation
 Some information about the history of the Rangitikei District at www.movetothecountry.co.nz